Lycée Français Sadi Carnot, also known as Collège français Sadi Carnot or the Lycée Français Diego Suarez (LFDS), is a French international school in Antsiranana (Diego Suarez), Madagascar. It currently serves preschool (maternelle) through junior high school (collège):. It previously served preschool through senior high school.

The government of Madagscar designated the site as a French school on 7 August 1973, and it opened in September 1973, due to the Malagasization of the local school system. The older buildings use a Creole style.

See also
 Demographics of Madagascar

References

External links
 Lycée Français Sadi Carnot
 
 
 

Elementary and primary schools in Madagascar
French international schools in Madagascar
International high schools
1973 establishments in Madagascar
Educational institutions established in 1973
High schools and secondary schools in Madagascar